Kamengrad may refer to:

 Kamengrad Fort, a medieval ruin near Sanski Most, Bosnia and Herzegovina
 Donji Kamengrad, a village near Sanski Most, Bosnia and Herzegovina
 Gornji Kamengrad, a village near Sanski Most, Bosnia and Herzegovina
 Kamengrad coal mine, a coal mine in Bosnia and Herzegovina
 Andrićgrad, a construction project in Višegrad, Bosnia and Herzegovina